The Roman Catholic Diocese of Jacmel, erected 25 February 1988, is a suffragan of the Archdiocese of Port-au-Prince.

The diocese began with ten priests, and in 2007 had over fifty. Some have been sent as missionaries to such places as Brazil and Quebec.

Bishops

Ordinaries
 Guire Poulard (25 February 1988 - 9 March 2009, appointed Bishop of Les Cayes)
 Launay Saturné (28 April 2010 - 16 July 2018, appointed Archbishop of Cap-Haïtien)
 Glandas Marie Erick Toussaint (8 December 2018)

Other priest of this diocese who became bishop
Chibly Langlois, appointed Bishop of Fort-Liberté in 2004; future Cardinal

References

External links and references

GCatholic.org page for Diocese of Jacmel

Jacmel
Jacmel
Jacmel
Jacmel
Roman Catholic Ecclesiastical Province of Port-au-Prince